Sherpura, also known as Poharwala, is a town in Sri Ganganagar district Rajasthan, India.

References
GeoNet names server

Villages in Sri Ganganagar district